Kevin Campbell may refer to:

Kevin Campbell (baseball) (born 1964), American baseball player
Kevin Campbell (footballer) (born 1970), English football player
Kevin Campbell (hurler), Irish player of hurling
Kevin Campbell (politician) (born 1949), New Zealand politician
Kevin Campbell (scientist), American scientist
Kevin T. Campbell, U.S. Army general
Kevin Campbell (bowls) (born 1950), South African lawn bowler